Albert Beckaert (10 June 1910 – 29 May 1980) was a Belgian racing cyclist. He won the 1936 edition of the Liège–Bastogne–Liège.

References

External links

1910 births
1980 deaths
Belgian male cyclists
People from Wevelgem
Cyclists from West Flanders